This is a list of Danish monarchs, that is, the kings and queens regnant of Denmark. This includes:

 The Kingdom of Denmark (up to 1397)
 Personal union of Denmark and Norway (1380–1397)
 The Kalmar Union (1397–1536)
 Union of Denmark, Norway and Sweden (1397–1523)
 Union of Denmark and Norway (1523–1536/1537)
 The United Kingdoms of Denmark–Norway (1536/1537–1814)
 The Kingdom of Denmark (1814–present)
 Iceland (since the union between Denmark and Norway in 1380; independent kingdom in a personal union with Denmark 1918–1944; a sovereign republic since 1944)
 Greenland (since the union between Denmark and Norway in 1380; effective Danish–Norwegian control began in 1721; integrated into the Danish realm in 1953; internal home rule introduced 1979; self-determination assumed in 2009; Greenland has two out of 179 seats in the Danish parliament Folketinget)
 Faroe Islands (since the union between Denmark and Norway in 1380; County of Denmark 1816–1948; internal home rule introduced 1948; The Faroe Islands have two out of 179 seats in the Danish parliament Folketinget)

The House of Oldenburg held the Danish Crown between 1448 and 1863, when it passed to the house of Schleswig-Holstein-Sonderburg-Glücksburg, a cadet branch of the same house, patrilineally descended from King Christian III of Denmark. The kingdom had been elective (although the eldest son or brother of the previous king was usually elected) until 1660, when it became hereditary and absolutist. Until 1864 Denmark was also united in a personal union with the duchies of Holstein and Saxe-Lauenburg (1814–1864), and in a political and personal union with the Duchy of Schleswig.

Pre-Knýtlinga Danish monarchs

The exact date of origin of the Kingdom of Denmark is not established, but names of Danish kings begins to emerge in foreign sources from the 8th century and onwards. Danish and Nordic legendary stories, chronicles and sagas often have accounts of Danish kings and dynasties stretching further back in time than the 7th century, but the historicity of the content and interpretations of these stories are often put to doubt.

Chochilaicus—see Hugleik and Hygelac— 515 AD, mentioned by Gregory of Tours (538–594). Hugleik, according to the written sources, suffered a defeat in 515 during a naval expedition to the Frankish Empire. Hugleik is the first Danish king mentioned in European sources.
Ongendus (Angantyr):  Saint Willibrord wrote about when he visited the Danes, at the time ruled by Ongendus.
Harald, named as former king in relating 9th-century events, perhaps model for legendary Harald Wartooth. Related to the Frisian king Redbad II who in 754 had to flee to "the land of the Danes" where King Harald reigned ("Daniae Regi Heraldi").
Sigfred: 770s–790s
Gudfred: 804–810, mentioned as Danish king in the Treaty of Heiligen 811. Alternate spellings: Godfred, Göttrick (German), Godric(Anglicized English), Gøtrik (Danish), Gudrød (Danish)
Hemming: 810–811/812 The Treaty of Heiligen was signed in 811 between the Danish King Hemming and Charlemagne.
Sigfred, nephew of Gudfred, and Anulo (Anlaufr), grandson or nephew of Harald, fought for the throne and both were killed, perhaps model for the legendary Sigurd Hring: 
Harald Klak and his brothers Ragnfrid and Hemming Halfdansson: 812–813 and again from 819/827. From 826 he and his household lived in exile with the Frankish emperor Louis the Pious, he was baptized by the bishop of Mainz in Ingelheim am Rhein. The last reference of Harald in the written sources are in the Annals of Fulda which records his execution for treason in 852.
Sons of Gudfred (Godrik): 814–820s
Horik I: (814) 827–854, King of the Danes (at first ruling jointly with his unnamed brothers). The Frankish annals mention Horik on numerous occasions during the next couple of decades.
Horik II: 854–860s. He is believed to have been the immediate successor of Horik I, but the annals are silent about the name of the Danish king for a few years after the disaster of 854.  In 857, Horik II allowed Rorik to occupy the part of the kingdom between the sea and the Eider. Horik II was still alive in 864, when a letter was addressed to him by Pope Nicholas I.
Late 9th century kings
Bagsecg: 
Halfdan: 871–877
Sigfred: . It is generally assumed that he was the immediate successor of Horik II, although that is not certain.  His year of succession is unknown, but it was between 864 (when Horik II was still king) and his first appearance as king in the Frankish annals in 873. Sigifrid was baptized in 882.
Gudfred: 880s
Heiligo (Halga): 890s (?), described by Adam of Bremen as the immediate predecessor of the House of Olof.
The "House of Olaf": late 9th century and early 10th century. This dynasty is described by Adam of Bremen, and members of this claimed dynasty are commemorated by the two Sigtrygg Runestones, which represent contemporary evidence that some of these kings controlled at least part of Denmark.
Olof, said by Adam to have come from Sweden and defeated Heiligo, taking the crown.
Gyrd and Gnupa, sons and joint successors of Olof, according to Adam. Gnupa is named by Widukind of Corvey as leader of the Danes in 934, and appears on the Sigtrygg Runestones.
Sigtrygg, son of Gnupa, memorialized on the Sigtrygg Runestones, presumably dating from shortly after 934.

Semi-legendary kings
 Ragnar Lodbrok, a legendary king probably in the 9th century, only appears in sagas and late histories, and these accounts are wildly inconsistent. He may be a composite character, a chimera of several historical kings and Vikings.
 Sigurd Snake-in-the-Eye (da: Sigurd Orm-i-øje or Snogeøje). Mentioned by late Chronicon Roskildense and Ragnarssona þáttr. Said to be king of Zealand and Scania, and son of Ragnar Lodbrok. He may be inspired by late 9th century King Sigfred (above).
 Harthacnut (Hardeknud). According to the sagas he is son of Sigurd Snake-in-the-Eye, but some historians identify him with Adam's Hardegon, Svein's son, who invaded Denmark from Northmannia and supplanted the House of Olof. He may have ruled only part of Denmark, as Adam places the commencement of his long reign between 909 and 915, while the House of Olof was still ruling at least part of Denmark as late as 934.  He was father of Gorm the Old.

List of monarchs of Denmark

House of Gorm (c. 936–1042)

House of Fairhair (1042–1047)

House of Estridsen (1047–1375)

House of Bjelbo (1376–1387)

House of Estridsen (1387–1412)

House of Pomerania (1396–1439)

House of Palatinate-Neumarkt (1440–1448)

House of Oldenburg (1448–1863)

|-
| 1 September 144821 May 1481()
| 
| 
| February 1426Oldenburgeldest son of Dietrich, Count of Oldenburg and Helvig of Schauenburg
| Dorothea of Brandenburg28 October 1449Church of Our Ladyfive children
| 21 May 1481Copenhagen Castleaged 55
|-
| (Hans)21 May 148120 February 1513()
| 
| 
| 2 February 1455Aalborghus Castlethird son of Christian I and Dorothea of Brandenburg
| Christina of Saxony6 September 1478Copenhagenfive children
| 20 February 1513Aalborghus Castleaged 58
|-
| 22 July 151320 January 1523()(deposed)
| 
| 
| 1 July 1481Nyborg Castlesecond son of John and Christina of Saxony
| Isabella of Austria12 August 1515Copenhagensix children
| 25 January 1559Kalundborg Castleaged 77
|-
| 13 April 152310 April 1533()
| 
| 
| 7 October 1471Haderslevhus Castlefourth son of Christian I and Dorothea of Brandenburg
| (1) Anna of Brandenburg10 April 1502Stendaltwo children(2) Sophie of Pomerania9 October 1518Kiel Castlesix children
| 10 April 1533Gottorp Castleaged 61
|-
|align="center" colspan="6"| Interregnum (1533–1534)
|-
| 4 July 15341 January 1559()
| 
| 
| 12 August 1503Gottorp Castleonly son of Frederick I and Anna of Brandenburg
| Dorothea of Saxe-Lauenburg29 October 1525Lauenburg Castlefive children
| 1 January 1559Koldinghus Castleaged 55
|-
| 1 January 15594 April 1588()
| 
| 
| 1 July 1534Haderslevhus Castleeldest son of Christian III and Dorothea of Saxe-Lauenburg
| Sophie of Mecklenburg-Güstrow20 July 1572Copenhageneight children
| 4 April 1588Antvorskov Castleaged 53
|-
| 4 April 158828 February 1648()
| 
| 
| 12 April 1577Frederiksborg Palaceeldest son of Frederick II and Sophie of Mecklenburg-Güstrow
| (1) Anne Catherine of Brandenburg27 November 1597Haderslevhus Castleseven children(2) Kirsten Munk31 December 1615Copenhagentwelve children
| 28 February 1648Rosenborg Castleaged 70
|-
| 6 July 16489 February 1670()
| 
| 
| 18 March 1609Haderslevhus Castlethird son of Christian IV and Anne Catherine of Brandenburg
| Sophie Amalie of Brunswick-Lüneburg1 October 1643Glücksburg Castleeight children
| 9 February 1670Copenhagen Castleaged 60
|-
| 9 February 167025 August 1699()
| 
| 
| 15 April 1646Duborg Castleeldest son of Frederick III and Sophie Amalie of Brunswick-Lüneburg
| Charlotte Amalie of Hesse-Kassel25 June 1667Nykøbing Castleeight children
| 25 August 1699Copenhagen Castleaged 53
|-
| 25 August 169912 October 1730()
| 
| 
| 11 October 1671Copenhagen Castleeldest son of Christian V and Charlotte Amalie of Hesse-Kassel
| (1) Louise of Mecklenburg-Güstrow5 December 1695Copenhagenfive children(2) Elisabeth Helene von Vieregg6 September 1703one son(3) Anne Sophie Reventlow4 April 1721Copenhagenthree children
| 12 October 1730Odense Palaceaged 59
|-
| 12 October 17306 August 1746()
| 
| 
| 30 November 1699Copenhagen Castlesecond son of Frederick IV and Louise of Mecklenburg-Güstrow
| Sophia Magdalene of Brandenburg-Kulmbach7 August 1721Pretzsch Castlethree children
| 6 August 1746Hirschholm Palaceaged 46
|-
| 6 August 174614 January 1766()
| 
| 
| 31 March 1723Copenhagen Castleonly son of Christian VI and Sophia Magdalene of Brandenburg-Kulmbach
| (1) Louise of Great Britain11 December 1743Altonafive children(2) Juliana Maria of Brunswick-Wolfenbüttel8 July 1752Frederiksborg Palaceone son
| 14 January 1766Christiansborg Palaceaged 42
|-
| 14 January 176613 March 1808()
| 
| 
| 29 January 1749Christiansborg Palacesecond son of Frederick V and Louise of Great Britain
| Caroline Matilda of Great Britain8 November 1766Christiansborg Palacetwo children
| 13 March 1808Rendsburgaged 59
|-
| 13 March 18083 December 1839()
| 
| 
| 28 January 1768Christiansborg Palaceonly son of Christian VII and Caroline Matilda of Great Britain
| Marie Sophie of Hesse-Kassel31 July 1790Gottorp Castleeight children
| 3 December 1839Amalienborg Palaceaged 71
|-
| Christian Frederick3 December 183920 January 1848()
| 
| 
| 18 September 1786Christiansborg Palaceeldest son of Frederick, Hereditary Prince of Denmark and Sophia Frederica of Mecklenburg-Schwerin
| (1) Charlotte Frederica of Mecklenburg-Schwerin21 June 1806Ludwigslust Castletwo sons(2) Caroline Amalie of Schleswig-Holstein-Sonderburg-Augustenburg22 May 1815Augustenborg Palaceno issue
| 20 January 1848Amalienborg Palaceaged 61
|-
| Frederik Carl Christian20 January 184815 November 1863()
| 
| 
| 6 October 1808Amalienborg Palacesecond son of Christian VIII and Charlotte Frederica of Mecklenburg-Schwerin
| (1) Vilhelmine Marie of Denmark1 November 1828Christiansborg Palaceno issue(2) Caroline of Mecklenburg10 June 1841Neustrelitzno issue(3) Louise Rasmussen7 August 1850Frederiksborg Palaceno issue
| 15 November 1863Glücksburg Castleaged 55
|}

House of Schleswig-Holstein-Sonderburg-Glücksburg (since 1863)

|-
| 15 November 186329 January 1906()
| 
| 
| 8 April 1818Gottorf Castlefourth son of Friedrich Wilhelm, Duke of Schleswig-Holstein-Sonderburg-Glücksburg and Princess Louise Caroline of Hesse-Kassel
| Louise of Hesse-Kassel26 May 1842Amalienborg Palacesix children
| 29 January 1906Amalienborg Palaceaged 87
| Great-grandson of King Frederick V and male-line descendant of King Christian III
| 
|-
|  Christian Frederik Vilhelm Carl 29 January 190614 May 1912()
| 
| 
| 3 June 1843Yellow Palaceeldest son of Christian IX and Louise of Hesse-Kassel
| Louise of Sweden28 July 1869Stockholmeight children
| 14 May 1912Jungfernstieg, Hamburgaged 68
| Son of King Christian IX
| 
|-
| Christian Carl Frederik Albert Alexander Vilhelm 14 May 191220 April 1947()
| 
| 
| 26 September 1870Charlottenlund Palaceeldest son of Frederick VIII and Louise of Sweden
| Alexandrine of Mecklenburg-Schwerin26 April 1898Cannestwo sons
| 20 April 1947Amalienborg Palaceaged 76
| Son of King Frederick VIII
| 
|-
| Christian Frederik Franz Michael Carl Valdemar Georg 20 April 194714 January 1972()
| 
| 
| 11 March 1899Sorgenfri Palaceeldest son of Christian X and Alexandrine of Mecklenburg-Schwerin
| Ingrid of Sweden24 May 1935Storkyrkan Cathedral, Stockholmthree daughters
| 14 January 1972Amalienborg Palaceaged 72
| Son of King Christian X
| 
|-
| Margrethe Alexandrine Þórhildur Ingrid 14 January 1972Present()
| 
| 
| 16 April 1940Amalienborg Palaceeldest daughter of Frederick IX and Ingrid of Sweden
| Henri de Laborde de Monpezat10 June 1967Holmen Church, Copenhagentwo sons
| IncumbentAge 
| Daughter of King Frederick IX
| 
|}

Timeline of Danish monarchs

See also

Danish monarchs' family tree
Line of succession to the Danish throne
List of Danish royal consorts
Coronation of the Danish monarch
Style of the Danish sovereign
Danish Crown Regalia
Danish Orders of Chivalry
Lists of office-holders

Notes

Further reading
 "Royal Lineage" Royal Family – The Monarchy in Denmark.
 "Kongerækken" Kongehuset.

 
Monarchs
Denmark